Michael Bacall (born Michael Stephen Buccellato; April 19, 1973) is an American screenwriter and actor, known for having co-written the films Scott Pilgrim vs. the World, 21 Jump Street, and Project X.

Life and career
Bacall was born in Los Angeles, California to a family of Sicilian descent. He acted in movies and television from an early age.

Turning to writing in the 2000s, he co-wrote and co-starred in Manic. As of 2007, Bacall has sold a number of scripts to major studios, including Psycho Funky Chimp and In Search of Captain Zero.

In June 2007, New Line announced that Bacall would be writing a feature adaptation of the documentary The King of Kong. He co-wrote the adaptation of the Canadian graphic novel series Scott Pilgrim, Scott Pilgrim vs. the World, with its director, Edgar Wright.

Filmography

Acting
1985: Highway to Heaven as Jimmy Patterson
1989: Columbo: "Columbo Goes to the Guillotine" as Tommy
1989: Wait Until Spring, Bandini as Arturo Bandini
1991: Shout as Big Boy
1993: Irresistible force as Jesse Delvechio
1993: Free Willy as Perry
1993: This Boy's Life as Terry Taylor
1993: The Nanny as Tommy
1997: Buffy the Vampire Slayer: "Some Assembly Required" as Eric Gittleson
2000: Urban Legends: Final Cut as Dirk Reynolds
2001: Manic as Chad
 2002: Pumpkin as Casey Whitner
 2002: Speakeasy as Gene
2004: Undertow as Jacob
2007: Grindhouse – Death Proof as Omar
2009: Inglourious Basterds as Pfc. Michael Zimmerman
2012: Django Unchained as Smitty Bacall (uncredited)
 2013: The End of Love as himself
 2013: Gangster Squad as Comanche
2018: Spivak as Wally Spivak

Screenwriting
2001: Manic2003: Bookies2010: Scott Pilgrim vs. the World2012: Project X2012: 21 Jump Street2014: 22 Jump StreetTBA:  Weird ScienceTBA: The Running Man''

References

External links

1973 births
Living people
American male child actors
American male film actors
American male screenwriters
American writers of Italian descent
Male actors from Los Angeles
Writers from Los Angeles
20th-century American male actors
21st-century American male actors
Screenwriters from California